Adam Scheinman is an American screenwriter and former professional tennis player.

Scheinman studied at the University of Virginia, where he was a member of the varsity tennis team, before competing on the professional tour during the 1980s. He featured in the men's doubles main draw of the 1982 Wimbledon Championships. As a screenwriter his credits include the film Mickey Blue Eyes, starring Hugh Grant. His brother Andrew, who was also a tennis player, is a film and television producer.

References

External links
 
 

Year of birth missing (living people)
Living people
American male tennis players
American male screenwriters
Virginia Cavaliers men's tennis players